Lycium shawii, desert thorn or Arabian boxthorn is a species of thorny shrub adapted to desert environments, and can be found throughout the Arabian peninsula, and some places in Africa. The leaves narrow towards their base. It produces small whitish-pink or purple flowers from September until April, and red pea-sized seedy berries that are edible. Plants often growing nearby include Acacia tortilis and Prosopis cineraria.

Uses
The stems, leaves and berries are used in traditional medicine. In Yemen, the pounded leaves of this shrub have been used as a cure for eye ailments. The berries have a laxative effect and were used in traditional medicine to relieve constipation and as a diuretic. Livestock eat new growth on the plant.

See also
 History of Al-Baqi' Cemetery in Medina, Hejaz
 Dhofar, Oman

References

shawii